Lectionary 1966 designated by sigla ℓ 1966 (in the Gregory-Aland numbering), is a Greek minuscule manuscript of the New Testament, written on parchment. Paleographically it has been assigned to the 11th/12th century (or about 1200).

Description  
The codex contains Lessons from the four Gospels lectionary (Evangelistarium) on 224 parchment leaves (33.0 cm by 26.0 cm). Written in two columns per page, in 29 lines per page. Four paper leaves added at the end.

History 

The codex now is located in the Kenneth Willis Clark Collection of the Duke University (Gk MS 12)  at Durham.

See also 
 List of New Testament lectionaries
 Biblical manuscripts 
 Textual criticism

References

Further reading  
 Normann A. Huffman, "The Text of Mark in the Duke New Testament", unpublished M.A. thesis, Duke University, 1932.

External links 

 Lectionary 1966 at the Kenneth Willis Clark Collection of Greek Manuscripts 

Greek New Testament lectionaries
11th-century biblical manuscripts
Duke University Libraries